Kyzyltash (Qyzyltaş), previously Krasnokamenka, in both languages meaning red stone, is a place in North Kazakhstan Region, Kazakhstan.

References

Populated places in North Kazakhstan Region